Alexander Sekulov (born 6 January 1964, Plovdiv, Bulgaria) is a contemporary Bulgarian writer. He graduated professional school for stage arts as an assistant producer and Bulgarian philology as a master at the Plovdiv University Paisiy Hilendarski. Sekulov's poetry and prose had been translated into English, German, French and Hungarian.

Books 
 Seventh Sky  (1988, poetry);
 High above the Distance  (1997, poetry);
 Enchanting and Light  (2003, poetry);
 Maps and Geographies  (2010, poetry);
 The Master and the Stones  (1996, essays);
 The High Stone Hills  (2006, fragments);
 The History of the Minimum Resistance. Chronological novel in one column  (2008, non-fiction);
 Light Hotel Rooms  (2005, play);
 The Collector of Love Sentences  (2007, 2008, novel);
 The Little Saint and the Oranges (2009, novel);
 Nasco H. Stories with Rum, Ginger, Raisons and Honey  (2005, art collection published in partnership with Atanas Hranov);
 The Little Saint and the Black Pepper Men  (2007, art collection published in partnership with Atanas Hranov).

References

External links 
 Alexander Sekulov's Profile at Contemporary Bulgarian Writers
 Alexander Sekulov at Capital Light

1964 births
Living people
Bulgarian writers